Qualification for the 1990 AFC Youth Championship. The main sources for information are RSSSF.com and FIFA Technical Report 1991 (see external links). In cases where the two sources disagree, FIFA's report is documented here.

Indonesia qualified as hosts.

Groups
Winners of each group qualified for the final tournament.

Group 1
Matches were played in Taif, Saudi Arabia.

Group 2
The group consisted of Kuwait and Qatar. Kuwait withdrew due to the Gulf War, so Qatar qualified automatically.

Group 3
Matches were played in Aleppo, Syria.

Group 4
Matches were played in Calicut, India.

Group 5
Matches were played in Dhaka, Bangladesh.

Group 6
Matches were played in Kunming, China.

Group 7

Japan qualified for the final tournament.

External links
 RSSSF
 FIFA Technical Report 1991, page 13 (archived here)

qualification
AFC U-19 Championship qualification